Rivière du Rempart can refer to several things in Mauritius:

Rivière du Rempart District
Rivière-du-Rempart, a village in the district of Rivière du Rempart
Rivière du Rempart (river)
AS Rivière du Rempart, an association football club